Cleveland Kenneth Wayne Taylor (born 9 September 1983) is an former professional footballer who plays as a forward and winger for Quorn as their player-manager.

He has previously played for Bolton Wanderers, Exeter City, Scarborough, Scunthorpe United, Carlisle United, Brentford, St Johnstone, Burton Albion, Grimsby Town, Harrogate Town and Stamford AFC. Born in England, he represented Jamaica internationally at youth level U20 and U21.

Club career
Born in Leicester, Leicestershire, Taylor began his career at Premier League club Bolton Wanderers as a youngster in 2001, but his chances were limited and he made just two substitute appearances for them, both in the FA Cup. He was subsequently loaned out for spells at both Exeter City and Scarborough. He left Bolton Wanderers in 2003 and joined Scunthorpe United permanently, he went on to make 96 appearances at The Iron, scoring 12 goals in the process. He played a part in Scunthorpe's success during the 2006–07 season when they won promotion to the Championship. Taylor was one of the scorers for Scunthorpe United as they comfortably beat Carlisle United 3–0 on the last day of the 2006–07 season. His chances were limited during the first half of the 2007–2008 season, and Taylor stated he would not sign any contract extension offered by Scunthorpe. This alerted several clubs, but it was the Brunton Park club that caught Taylor's eye.

Taylor made his Carlisle United début against Walsall at Brunton Park on 3 February 2008, a game that Carlisle came back from 1–0 down to win 2–1. Taylor then went on to score his first goal for the Blues against Southend United which turned out to be the winning goal as Carlisle ended up 2–1 winners.

On 13 August 2009, Taylor was announced as a Brentford player for an undisclosed fee, becoming Andy Scott's 12th signing of the summer. He scored his first and only goal for Brentford in a 1–1 draw with Southampton on 22 August 2009.

Taylor joined Burton Albion on loan until the end of the season on 14 January 2010.

On 1 July 2010, Taylor signed for Perth-based St Johnstone. He scored his first and only goal for St Johnstone in a 1–1 draw with Kilmarnock on 15 January 2011.

Taylor joined Burton Albion on a two-year contract after his release from St Johnstone. On 28 March 2013, Taylor joined Grimsby Town on loan for the remainder of the 2012–13 season. Taylor was released by Burton at the end of the 2012–13 season.

In July 2013 he joined Southend United on trial. In August 2013 he signed for Harrogate Town, and after a loan spell with Corby Town he joined them permanently during the 2014 off-season. He subsequently played for Barwell, Matlock Town, Coalville Town, Stamford and Quorn, player-managing the latter club.

International career
Taylor has represented Jamaica at under-20 and under-23 (Olympic) levels.

Personal life 
As of May 2020, Taylor was living and working near Quorn, Leicestershire.

References

External links
 
 

1983 births
Living people
Footballers from Leicester
English people of Jamaican descent
English footballers
Jamaican footballers
Association football wingers
Bolton Wanderers F.C. players
Exeter City F.C. players
Scarborough F.C. players
Scunthorpe United F.C. players
Carlisle United F.C. players
Brentford F.C. players
Burton Albion F.C. players
Grimsby Town F.C. players
Harrogate Town A.F.C. players
Corby Town F.C. players
Coalville Town F.C. players
English Football League players
National League (English football) players
Northern Premier League players
Southern Football League players
St Johnstone F.C. players
Scottish Premier League players
United Counties League players
Quorn F.C. players
Quorn F.C. managers
Stamford A.F.C. players
Matlock Town F.C. players
Barwell F.C. players